Brookfield Place (formerly BCE Place), is an office complex in downtown Toronto, Ontario, Canada, comprising the  block bounded by Yonge Street, Wellington Street West, Bay Street, and Front Street. The complex contains  of office space, and consists of two towers, Bay Wellington Tower and TD Canada Trust Tower, linked by the Allen Lambert Galleria.  Brookfield Place is also the home of the Hockey Hall of Fame (housed in an opulent former bank from 1885).

Design 
The TD Canada Trust Tower is noted for its recessed design and spire on the upper levels and stands at 53 storeys.  Designed by Bregman + Hamann Architects and Skidmore, Owings & Merrill, the tower was completed in 1990 and was initially known as the Canada Trust Tower until 2000 when Toronto-Dominion Bank purchased Canada Trust. Canada Trust signage was atop the spire of building until 2000 when it was replaced by a "TD" logo. Until July 2015, the "TD" logo in the downtown Toronto skyline was solely displayed on the Canada Trust Tower, unlike the nearby towers of the Toronto-Dominion Centre which lacked signage.

Bay Wellington Tower is a 49-story office tower, designed by Bregman + Hamann Architects and completed in 1992.  Architecturally it is meant to complement the Canada Trust Tower; for instance parts of the Bay Wellington Tower are recessed while that of the Canada Trust Tower would protrude out and vice versa, and the Bay Wellington Tower has a twin peak or double spires compared to the Canada Trust Tower's single spire.

Allen Lambert Galleria 
Allen Lambert Galleria, sometimes described as the "crystal cathedral of commerce", is an atrium designed by Spanish architect Santiago Calatrava which connects Bay Street with Sam Pollock Square. Structural Design was completed by Yolles Parnership Inc., while the General Contractor was PCL Construction and the Structural Steel was fabricated by Canron Construction Corporation.  The six story high pedestrian thoroughfare is structured by eight freestanding supports on each side of the Galleria, which branch out into parabolic shapes evoking a forest canopy or a tree-lined avenue because of the presence of building facades along the sides of the structure.

The Galleria was the result of an international competition and was incorporated into the development in order to satisfy the City of Toronto's public art requirements. It is a frequently photographed space, and is heavily featured as a backdrop for news reports, as well as TV and film productions.

The parabolic arched roof that Santiago Calatrava created for the assembly hall of the Wohlen High School in Wohlen, Aargau, Switzerland, is generally considered to be a precursor of the vaulted, parabolic ceiling in the Galleria.

Ownership
Brookfield Place serves as the headquarters for Brookfield Properties, which owns the Bay Wellington Tower section of the complex. The TD Tower section was owned in entirety by the Ontario Municipal Employees Retirement System (OMERS) through its subsidiary Oxford Properties. In late 2012 or early 2013, OMERS and an unconfirmed entity identified in news reports as the Public Sector Pension Investment Board (PSP) completed a swap transaction in which OMERS reduced its ownership stake in the tower to 50%. According to the Financial Post, "A spokesman for PSP would not confirm the deal had taken place, noting the pension fund never comments on any transaction." The swap valued the 50% stake in the tower at C$465 million, or C$750 per square foot, a record for commercial property in Canada.

Hockey Hall of Fame

The opulent former Bank of Montreal branch at the northwest corner of Yonge and Front streets, built in 1885, also forms part of the complex, and now serves as part of the Hockey Hall of Fame.  It contains portraits of all Hall of Fame inductees, and houses a number of hockey trophies, including the first Stanley Cup trophy.

Gallery

See also

 List of tallest buildings in Toronto
List of tallest buildings in Canada

References

External links

 
 Photos of Brookfield Place
 Description of Allen Lambert Galleria
 Heritage elements of Brookfield Place

Office buildings completed in 1990
Office buildings completed in 1992
Santiago Calatrava structures
Skidmore, Owings & Merrill buildings
Skyscrapers in Toronto
PATH (Toronto)
Skyscraper office buildings in Canada
Postmodern architecture in Canada
Oxford Properties
Brookfield Properties buildings